Dieppe is a provincial electoral district for the Legislative Assembly of New Brunswick, Canada.

It was created in 2006 as a result of large population growth in the City of Dieppe. It includes 4 of 5 wards of the city of Dieppe and a small portion of Moncton near Champlain Place shopping mall. The name of the district was briefly Dieppe Centre, but the legislature changed it to Dieppe Centre-Lewisville before an election was held in the district.  In the 2013 redistribution it lost those parts of Moncton in the district, gained some parts of Dieppe from the abolished district of Memramcook-Lakeville-Dieppe, while losing some of Dieppe to the new district of Shediac Bay-Dieppe.

Members of the Legislative Assembly

Election results

Dieppe

|-

Dieppe Centre-Lewisville

References

External links 
Website of the Legislative Assembly of New Brunswick
Map of riding as of 2018

New Brunswick provincial electoral districts
Politics of Dieppe, New Brunswick
2006 establishments in New Brunswick
Constituencies established in 2006